San Pablo de Lípez is a small town in the Potosí Department of Bolivia. It is the seat of the Sur Lípez Province and of the San Pablo de Lípez Municipality.

See also 
 Kuntur Wasi
 Q'illu Salli
 Yana Urqu
 Yuraq Urqu

References

Populated places in Potosí Department